The Battle of Medininkai took place on 27 July 1320 between the Teutonic Order and the Samogitian army near Medininkai (now Varniai).

Battle
The Teutonic army, which consisted of 40 knights, crew of the Klaipėda Castle, and Sambians, was commanded by Marshal Heinrich von Plötzke. When the Teutonic army attacked Medininkai land, part of the crusaders spread out to loot. The Samogitians suddenly attacked their main forces. Von Plötzke, 29 knights, and many soldiers were killed, while Gerhard Rude, vogt of Sambia, was taken captive. 

The battle stopped the Teutonic attacks on Medininkai land until Grand Duke of Lithuania Gediminas concluded a truce with the Teutonic Order (1324–1328).

References

1320 in Europe
Medininkai
Medininkai 1320
Medininkai 1320
14th century in Lithuania
14th century in the State of the Teutonic Order